The Lower Side of Uptown is the seventh studio album by the alternative rock band Toadies. It was released in September 2017 by independent record label Kirtland Records.

Background
Lead guitarist Clark Vogeler stated the 'original compositions' make the album "closest to old-school Toadies than any others we’ve made in the last 10 years." He said "I feel that subconsciously we thought that this record would have ended up incorporating some of that quieter sound, but that didn’t happen." The album was produced by Chris “Frenchie” Smith. The album was described as "a well thought-out project with a lot of talent."

Track listing

Personnel
Vaden Todd Lewis – lead vocals, rhythm guitar
Clark Vogeler – lead guitar, backing vocals
Doni Blair – bass
Mark Reznicek – drums

Charts

References

2017 albums
Toadies albums
Kirtland Records albums